Cambarus unestami, the blackbarred crayfish, is a species of crayfish in the family Cambaridae. It is native to Alabama and Georgia in the United States.

The IUCN conservation status of Cambarus unestami is "LC", least concern, with no immediate threat to the species' survival. The IUCN status was reviewed in 2010.

References

Further reading

 
 
 

Cambaridae
Freshwater crustaceans of North America
Articles created by Qbugbot
Crustaceans described in 1969
Taxa named by Horton H. Hobbs Jr.